Mohamed Bouhizeb (27 May 1942 – 1996) was an Algerian footballer who played as a striker. An Algerian international, he played for SCM Oran and MC Oran at club level.

Honours
MC Oran
 Algerian Championnat National: 1971
 Algerian Cup: 1975

Algeria
 All-Africa Games fourth place: 1965

External links
 
 Mohamed Bouhizeb statistics - dzfootball

1942 births
1996 deaths
Footballers from Oran
Association football forwards
Algerian footballers
Algeria international footballers
Footballers at the 1965 All-Africa Games
African Games competitors for Algeria
SCM Oran players
MC Oran players
Algerian Ligue Professionnelle 1 players